This is a list of films produced in South Korea in 1956.

References

External links

 1945-1959 at koreanfilm.org

South Korea
1956
Films